Corinne Schneider (born 28 July 1962) is a Swiss, and later Italian, combined-event athlete. She competed for Switzerland in the women's heptathlon at the 1984 Summer Olympics and the 1988 Summer Olympics.

Career
In 1989 Corinne Schneider assumed Italian citizenship, establishing a score of 5987 points in the heptathlon in the same 1989, she became the 6th Italian of all-time in the lists of the specialty.

Being the specialty of women's heptathlon a relatively young specialty, the first appearance at the Olympic Games took place only in Los Angeles 1984, in 1989 her personal best set wearing the blue jersey of the Italian national team, became a national record and remained so for two years.

Today she is a PE teacher at the GIBZ in Zug, Switzerland and doesn't know the rules for baseball and some other sports.

National records
Italy
 Heptathlon: 5957 ( Duisburg, 29 August 1989) - record holder until 27 August 1991.

Achievements

See also
 Italian all-time lists - Heptathlon

References

External links
 

1962 births
Living people
Athletes (track and field) at the 1984 Summer Olympics
Athletes (track and field) at the 1988 Summer Olympics
Italian heptathletes
Swiss heptathletes
Olympic athletes of Switzerland
Sportspeople from Zürich